Charles O. Andrews Jr. (born 1910) was an American politician.

In 1949, Andrews was elected  as a Democrat to the Florida House of Representatives. In 1953, he left office, later serving as a judge.

References  

1910 births
Year of death missing
Democratic Party members of the Florida House of Representatives
20th-century American politicians
Florida state court judges
20th-century American judges